Oresitrophe is a genus of flowering plants belonging to the family Saxifragaceae.

Its native range is Northern China.

Species
Species:
 Oresitrophe rupifraga Bunge

References

Saxifragaceae
Saxifragaceae genera
Taxa named by Alexander von Bunge